Armando Rangel Hernández (born 20 October 1965) is a Mexican politician affiliated with the National Action Party. He served as Deputy of the LIX Legislature of the Mexican Congress representing Guanajuato and previously served as municipal president of San Luis de la Paz.

References

1965 births
Living people
Politicians from Guanajuato
National Action Party (Mexico) politicians
20th-century Mexican politicians
21st-century Mexican politicians
Municipal presidents in Guanajuato
Deputies of the LIX Legislature of Mexico
Members of the Chamber of Deputies (Mexico) for Guanajuato